Bruna Ribeiro Hamú (born 10 August 1990) is a Brazilian actress and former model.

Career 

Hamú's first role was in the 20th season of Malhação. Before Malhação, she made a cameo in Sangue Bom. In 2016, Hamú joined the cast of A Lei do Amor, in which she played the valley girl Camila Costa Leitão.

Personal life 

Hamu has been in a relationship with businessman Diego B. Moregola since 2015. They have one son, Julio, born in 2017. Hamu and Moregola were married on July 29, 2018.

Filmography

Awards and nominations

References 

1990 births
Living people
People from Brasília
Brazilian film actresses
Brazilian female models